The Crushed Idol (French:L'idole brisée) is a 1920 French silent drama film directed by Maurice Mariaud and starring Lina Cavalieri.

Cast
 Henri Baudin 
 Lina Cavalieri
 Laure Dietrich 
 Louis Leubas 
 Maurice Mariaud

References

Bibliography
 Paul Fryer, Olga Usova. Lina Cavalieri: The Life of Opera's Greatest Beauty, 1874-1944. McFarland, 2003.

External links
 

1920 films
1920s French-language films
French silent films
Films directed by Maurice Mariaud
French black-and-white films
French drama films
1920 drama films
Silent drama films
1920s French films